Diphetor is a genus of mayflies in the family Baetidae,

References

Further reading

Mayfly genera